Nur Sarah Marie Hildebrand Asyraf Hildebrand (born 18 August 1990) is a Malaysian former model, actress, and television host. She began her acting career in 2015, with several minor television and film roles. Sarah has appeared in magazines such as InTrend, EH! and Hijabista. Her name was catapulted into the spotlight after successfully playing the role of Nadine in the drama serial Pujaan Hati Kanda in 2018.

Early life 
Sarah was born in Kuala Lumpur, Malaysia, and is of Malay, American and German descent. Her mother raised her as a single parent.

Career 
Hildebrand was the winner of Gadis M2 reality TV show in 2013. She has made appearances in commercials and music videos, and made her acting debut in the television film Hujan Pagi.

His acting debut was Mirip which was released in 2015, co-starring Fezrul Khan, Ezzaty Abdullah and Reen Rahim.

She appeared with Kilafairy, Erwin Dawson, Cristina Suzanne and Hefny Sahad in the mystery drama series, Nafas on ntv7, playing the role of Shila.

Sarah's name became popular and rose through the drama adaptation of the popular novel Pujaan Hati Kanda alongside Remy Ishak and Mira Filzah, where she played the role of the main antagonist named Nadine, where the character was her first antagonist appearance. The performance in the drama was praised by the media, in fact, the character Nadine played also attracted the audience's hatred for the character's sarcastic nature. The drama got a rating with a total audience of 12 million viewers.

Personal life
She married Otto Gillen, an American citizen, on November 3, 2019.

She previously wore the hijab in September 2015, but announced that she would no longer wear the hijab in October 2020.

In April 2022, Hildebrand announces her retirement from the entertainment industry after almost a decade. In late July the same year, Hilderband joined United States Air Force.

Filmography

Film

Telemovie film

TV series

Music video appearances

TV commercial

Host

Awards

References

External links 

 
 Sarah Hildebrand on Facebook
 Sarah Hildebrand on Instagram
 Sarah Hildebrand on YouTube

Malaysian female models
1990 births
Living people
Malaysian people of Malay descent
Malaysian people of American descent
Malaysian people of German descent
Malaysian Muslims